Social adroitness is a personality trait measured in the Jackson Personality Inventory and the Jackson Personality Inventory-Revised. Adroitness is not explicitly measured by these tests, but rather the characteristics are measured through different scales.

Adroitness assesses the ability to regulate your own behavior in order to get what you want from others. It differs from psychopathy in that the adroitness is not intrinsically narcissistic or manipulative, but refers rather to the set of social skills that allow one to work with others productively. In that sense it is closely related to conceptions of emotional intelligence.

Tools of adroit behavior include flattery, indirection, listening, circumspection, reciprocal altruism, politeness and strategic reasoning.

Jackson Personality Inventory-Revised
The Jackson Personality Inventory-Revised (JPI-R) is widely considered to be one of the most psychometrically sound measures of personality. In one convenient form, the JPI-R provides a measure of personality that reflects a variety of social, cognitive, and value orientations, which affect an individual's functioning.

JPI-R Scales and Test Construction
The JPI-R was originally based on Murray's theory of needs.

What is Adroitness?
Adroitness is defined by its characteristics and behaviors. Example behaviors include:

 The ability to pretend to enjoy things which you  dislike when it suits the individual's purpose.
 Changing the way you act to satisfy a person with whom you are dealing.
 Holding feelings in check if they might interfere with getting what you want from someone.
 Trying to appear less informed than you actually are.
 An ability to get the most out of people.
 Enjoying being nice to others.
 Changing others behavior, without letting them know why or even that you are doing it.

Diderot's Encyclopedie offers an early modern perception of adroitness, which in the following quotation is referred to as social finesse. In the quote below it describes the difference between finesse and delicacy.

"Finesse is not entirely the same thing as subtlety. You lay out a trap with finesse, you escape from it with subtlety; your conduct is fine or neatly turned out, you play a subtle trick; if you always act with finesse, you inspire distrust. It's always a mistake to find finesse in everything. Finesse in works of the mind, as in conversation, consists in the art of not expressing your thought directly, while letting it be easily understood: it's an enigma that witty people immediately solve. Once, when the Chancellor offered his protection to a high court, the chief justice said, turning towards his colleagues, "Gentlemen, let us give thanks to the Lord Chancellor, he's giving us more than we ask him for;" [4] that répartie is a very fine one. Finesse in conversation or in writing is not the same thing as delicacy; the former can be applied equally to witty and pleasant things, to blame and even to praise, even to indecent things that are covered by a veil through which you can see them without blushing. You can say bold things with finesse . Delicacy is used to express pleasant and gentle feelings, fine bits of praise; finesse is therefore used rather in an epigram, delicacy in a madrigal. Delicacy is contained in lovers' jealousies; finesse is not. The praises that Despréaux [5] sang to Louis XIV are not always equally delicate; [6] his satires are not always fine enough. When Iphigenia in Racine's tragedy receives the order from her father not to see Achilles any more, she cries out: Sweeter gods, you had asked only for my life.  [7] The true character of this line is rather delicacy than finesse ."

In general, people exhibiting this trait understand how to get the most out of people, often through indirect means.

Measuring Adroitness
As stated above, the adroitness trait is indirectly measured by the second and third clusters on the Jackson Personality Inventory-Revised, or JPI-R. The second cluster is the extroverted cluster, which contains the sociability, social confidence, and energy level scales. The third cluster is the emotional cluster, which contains the empathy, anxiety, and cooperativeness scales. Specifically, the sociability, empathy, and cooperativeness scales of the JPI-R measure adroitness.
The Five Factor Model, or FFM, measures adroitness through the extroversion and agreeableness clusters.

Comparisons to other traits
Adroitness is often compared to both psychopathy and Machiavellianism, as all three can be measured by similar scales on personality inventories.

Psychopathy
Psychopathy is a series of behaviors that loosely correspond with the Diagnostic and Statistical Manual of Mental Disorders diagnosis of Antisocial Personality Disorder, or ASPD. Psychopathy is made up of two parts, aggressive narcissism and a parasitic lifestyle, while ASPD only accounts for the narcissistic personality. 
Psychopathy is similar to adroitness in that the manipulation of others is an important factor. Psychopathy is considered a negative trait, while adroitness is considered a neutral trait. The difference lies in the intent of the manipulation. Psychopaths manipulate others for their own benefit or amusement, or to harm another person. People exhibiting the adroitness trait manipulate others in order to help other people and almost never intend to harm anyone.

Machiavellianism
Machiavellianism resembles psychopathy in the intent of the manipulation. It does not include the impulsive and dangerous behaviors associated with psychopathy.

Personality Inventories
As previously stated, adroitness is not clearly measured as a specific personality trait, but is instead measured by different scales and clusters.
Most personality inventories have some measure of honesty built in. Traits like psychopathy and Machiavellianism are usually measured as negative honesty traits. While adroitness is considered a positive trait compared to these two, the inherent manipulation makes it almost impossible to accurately place it on an honesty scale, which may account for why it is not more specifically measured on personality inventories.

Cognition and Adroitness
Because many of the behaviors associated with adroitness are similar to some of the behaviors associated with psychopathy, experiments that delve into the mind of the psychopath can shed light onto some of the brain function involved with the adroitness trait. In 2008, fMRI testing showed that psychopaths are impaired in basic emotional and cognitive functions. Because these functions are controlled by the prefrontal cortex and the temporal lobes of the brain, there must be some problem in these areas. Due to the aforementioned similarities, it follows that people expressing the adroitness trait may also have some kind of problem or damage in these parts of the brain. 
The cognitive functions of psychopaths and controls in this study were tested through the use of the Simon paradigm. This test measures reaction time based on stimulus and response locations. In the Müller et al. study, the stimuli were an X and an O, both of which appeared at different locations on a screen. The participant was required to respond by tapping the right side of a separate screen with their middle finger for X and on the left side with their index finger for O. In the control group, as the task became more difficult, negative emotion interfered with cognition. Essentially, as people became angrier, it became more difficult to accurately complete the task. However, as the psychopaths became angrier, their performance did not change, suggesting that there is a disconnect between the emotional process and cognitive abilities in the psychopathic brain.
If psychopaths have trouble connecting emotion to the thinking process, the perhaps those with the adroitness trait do as well. Certainly the ability to manipulate others requires a substantial amount of effort, regardless of emotion. The resource allocation model suggests that negative emotions worsen cognitive performance on difficult tasks because they drain resources that are required for cognitive processes. Manipulation and persuasion are cognitive processes that require a lot of effort due to the number of things that require focus. The art of manipulation requires some element of dishonesty as well as a significant knowledge of both the target as well as the purpose of manipulation, or the ability to fabricate important details. These elements are also required for persuasion. It follows that these processes must require a significant amount of effort, and therefore emotions, especially negative ones, would take resources away from those processes. 
Manipulation and persuasion can also be very stressful tasks. Stress is known to cause negative emotions, which are shown to interfere in complex cognitive processes. Therefore, people who express the adroitness trait may have similar damage to the prefrontal cortex and/or temporal lobe as psychopaths.

See also

References

Personality